Asiba Tupahache is a Matinecoc Nation Native American activist from New York and was a vice presidential candidate in the 1992 election on Peace and Freedom Party ticket, accompanying Ronald Daniels.  Born in Long Island, New York, she is a former public school teacher, an advocate of homeschooling, and a mother of two.  She authored the book Taking Another Look and its accompanying audiocassette, and is the editor and publisher of The Spirit of January Reflection, formerly titled The Spirit of January Monthly.

Bibliography
 Taking Another Look (1986)

References
 Adam Parfrey (1999). Apocalypse Culture 
 William Upski Wimsatt (1999). No More Prisons 

Year of birth missing (living people)
Living people
Female candidates for Vice President of the United States
Native American activists
Native American writers
Peace and Freedom Party vice presidential nominees
1992 United States vice-presidential candidates
20th-century American politicians
Activists from California
20th-century American women politicians
Native American candidates for Vice President of the United States
21st-century American women
Native American women writers
People from Long Island
20th-century Native American women
20th-century Native Americans
21st-century Native American women
21st-century Native Americans